Bullskin Run is a stream in the U.S. state of West Virginia.

Bullskin Run probably derives its name from the buffaloes which once roamed the area.

See also
List of rivers of West Virginia

References

Rivers of Jefferson County, West Virginia
Rivers of West Virginia